Paul Arthur Müller-Lehning  (23 October 1899, in Utrecht – 1 January 2000, in Lys-Saint-Georges) was a Dutch author, historian and anarchist.

Arthur Lehning wrote noted French translations of Mikhail Bakunin. In 1992 he won the Gouden Ganzenveer, and in 1999 the P. C. Hooft Award. In 1976 Arthur Lehning delivered the Huizinga Lecture, under the title: Over vrijheid en gelijkheid (On liberty and equality).

See also
 Anton Constandse

References

1899 births
2000 deaths
Dutch anarchists
20th-century Dutch historians
Anarchist theorists
Dutch centenarians
Men centenarians
Writers from Utrecht (city)
Dutch translators
P. C. Hooft Award winners
20th-century translators